is the second of a series of compilation albums of various Disney songs which has been remixed in the style of eurobeat. It is produced by Walt Disney Records, and was only released in Japan. The album Eurobeat Disney 2 was released on January 31, 2001.

Track listing
 Dave & Domino - "A Whole New World" (Aladdin) - 4.18
 Domino - "Colors Of The Wind" (Pocahontas) - 4.07
 Dave Rodgers - "Two Worlds" (Tarzan) - 4.40
 Mega NRG Man - "Go The Distance" (Hercules) - 4.24
 Susan Bell - "Part Of Your World" (The Little Mermaid) - 4.52
 Mickey B. - "Reflection" (Mulan) - 4.33
 Susan Bell feat. Powerful T. - "If I Never Knew You" (Pocahontas) - 4.00
 Mickey B. - "Circle of Life" (The Lion King) - 4.01
 Domino - "Some Day My Prince Will Come" (Snow White and the Seven Dwarfs) - 4.21
 Brian Ice - Someday (The Hunchback of Notre Dame) - 4.31
 Norma Sheffield - Once Upon A Dream (Sleeping Beauty) - 4.06
 Domino - "A Dream Is A Wish Your Heart Makes" (Cinderella) - 4.13
 Powerful T. - So This Is Love (Cinderella) 4.20
 Matt Land - Mickey And Minnie On A Moonlit Night (from the album Rock Around the Mouse) - 4.26
 Mega NRG Man feat. Dave Rodgers - Ducks Dance Too (from the album Mousercise) - 3.53
 Domino feat. TJ Davis - Mickey Motion (from the album Rock Around the Mouse) - 4.01
 Domino - "Mickey Mouse March" (Springtime Extended Version) (The Mickey Mouse Club) -4.09

External links
Eurobeat Disney 2 on Discogs

2
2001 compilation albums